Eden Valley is a valley in the U.S. state of Nevada.

Eden Valley was named from its spring-fed idyllic setting relative to the  arid surroundings.

References

Valleys of Humboldt County, Nevada